Mathematical Methods in the Physical Sciences is a 1966 textbook by mathematician Mary L. Boas intended to develop skills in mathematical problem solving needed for junior to senior-graduate courses in engineering, physics, and chemistry. The book provides a comprehensive survey of analytic techniques and provides careful statements of important theorems while omitting most detailed proofs. Each section contains a large number of problems, with selected answers. Numerical computational approaches using computers are outside the scope of the book.

The book, now in its third edition, was still widely used in university classrooms as of 1999
and is frequently cited in other textbooks and scientific papers.

Chapters
 Infinite series, power series
 Complex numbers
 Linear algebra
 Partial differentiation
 Multiple integrals
 Vector analysis
 Fourier series and transforms
 Ordinary differential equations
 Calculus of variations
 Tensor analysis
 Special functions
 Series solution of differential equations; Legendre, Bessel, Hermite, and Laguerre functions
 Partial differential equations
 Functions of a complex variable
 Integral transforms
 Probability and statistics

References

Further reading

Reviews of 1st edition

Reviews of 2nd edition

Mathematics textbooks
Physics textbooks